The Idler refers to someone idle:

 An idle game
 A slacker, a person who habitually avoids work
 Idler-wheel, a system used to transmit the rotation of the main shaft of a motor to another rotating device
 Idler circuit, a circuit in a parametric amplifier to generate an idle response

Idler or The Idler, or variant, may also refer to:

Books and publications
 The Idler (1758–60), a series of essays by Samuel Johnson and his contemporaries
 The Idler (1892–1911), a literary and humorous magazine started by Jerome K. Jerome
 The Idler (1993), a bi-monthly British magazine exploring alternative ways of working and living
 The Idler (Canadian magazine), a Canadian literary magazine published from 1985 to 1993
 The Idlers, a novel by Morley Roberts 1906

Music
 Idlers (Canadian band), a Canadian reggae band
 The Idlers, a United States Coast Guard Academy ensemble

Other uses
 Idler (yacht) American Yacht built in 1865 in Fairhaven, Connecticut
 An Idler, nom-de-plume of George Stillman Hillard (1808–1879)
 Salomon Idler (1610–1669), German shoemaker and aviation pioneer

See also

 
 
 
 Idle (disambiguation)